The 1996–97 European Hockey League was the first edition of the new tournament for European hockey clubs, the European Hockey League. The season started on September, 1996, and finished on January 26, 1997.

The tournament was won by TPS, who beat HC Dynamo Moscow in the final.

First round

Group A

Group A standings

Group B

Group B standings

Group C

Group C standings

Group D

Group D standings

Group E

Group E standings

Quarterfinals

Final stage
(Turku, Finland)

Semifinals

Third place match

Final

References
 Season 1997

1996–97 in European ice hockey leagues
European Hockey League